The 2015 Israeli Basketball League Cup, for sponsorships reasons the Winner League Cup, was the 10th edition of the pre-season tournament of the Israeli Basketball Super League. Maccabi Tel Aviv won the title for the 6th time. Hapoel Eilat were runners-up.

The tournament was held from 24 September 2015 until 28 September 2015 and the games were played in both the Holon Toto Hall in Holon and in the Drive in Arena in Tel Aviv.

Bracket

Final

References 

2015
League Cup